The 2018 Swindon Borough Council election took place on 3 May 2018, to elect members of Swindon Borough Council in England. This was on the same day as other local elections.

The Conservatives held on to their majority on the council but it was lowered to one after losing a councillor to the Liberal Democrats in Wroughton & Wichelstowe. The Liberal Democrats lost a councillor to Labour in Eastcott, so the election's net gain of one was to Labour from the Conservatives. Labour had had high hopes of winning control of the council, and the Party's leader Jeremy Corbyn had visited Swindon on five occasions during the local election campaign. The Party was reported to be 'deeply disappointed' with the result.

The Conservative Council leader David Renard described himself as "absolutely delighted" that his Party "fended off a significant challenge from the Labour Party".  The BBC's West of England politics editor Paul Barltrop felt Labour's failure to take the council would  be more than disappointing to party members, noting that Swindon tends to give an idea of what will happen at the next general election.

Swindon was one of the boroughs subject to a trial of voter ID restrictions requiring the production of polling cards.

Results by ward 
All changes calculated on 2014 results.

Blunsdon & Highworth

Central

Chiseldon & Lawn

Covingham & Dorcan

Eastcott

Gorsehill & Pinehurst

Haydon Wick

Liden, Eldene & Park South

Lydiard & Freshbrook

Mannington & Western

Old Town

Penhill & Upper Stratton

Priory Vale

Rodbourne Cheney

Shaw

St Andrews

St Margaret & South Marston

Walcot & Park North

Wroughton & Wichelstowe

References

2018 English local elections
2018
2010s in Wiltshire